Eutacutachee Creek is a stream in the U.S. state of Mississippi.

Eutacutachee  is a name derived from the Choctaw language purported to mean "chestnut little lake".

References

Rivers of Mississippi
Rivers of Rankin County, Mississippi
Mississippi placenames of Native American origin